Uraga is a genus of moths in the subfamily Arctiinae.

Species
 Uraga haemorrhoa Walker, 1854
 Uraga hyalina Gaede, 1926
 Uraga rubricollis Hampson, 1901
 Uraga trifida Dognin, 1908

References

Natural History Museum Lepidoptera generic names catalog

Arctiinae